The Ministry of Justice of the Slovak Republic is the central authority of the Slovak State Administration for the Courts and Bailiffs. The following are some of the primary goals of the Ministry:

 To prepare legislation in the areas of constitutional law, criminal law, civil law, commercial law, family law, bankruptcy law, and private international law.
 To carry out state supervision in the legally established scope over the activity of the court executors, over the activities of the Slovak Chamber of Executors, over the activities of the Notary Chamber of the Slovak Republic, and over the activity of notaries.
 To ensure the performance of expert activities, translation activities, and interpreting activities and the issuance of the Collection of Laws of the Slovak Republic and the Commercial Bulletin.
 To ensure the representation of Slovakia in the European Court of Human Rights, in the Court of Justice of the European Communities, and in the Court of First Instance of the European Communities.
 To ensure the fulfillment of tasks related to the membership of the Slovak Republic in Eurojust.

List of ministers

Ministers of Justice of the Autonomous Government of Slovakia for the period 1938–1939

Justice ministers in governments of first Slovak Republic for the period 1939–1945

Committees of Justice in the Slovak Corps of the Slovak National Council in the period 1944–1960

Povereníci justice and the chairmen of the commissions of the Slovak National Council of Justice for the period 1960–1968

Justice ministers in governments of Slovakia within the Czechoslovak Federation

Ministers of Justice of independent Slovakia

See also 

 Justice ministry
 Zoznam ministrov spravodlivosti Slovenskej republiky (List of Ministers of Justice of the Slovak Republic)
 Politics of Slovakia

References

Justice ministries
Government of Slovakia